This is a list of individuals who have served as Minister of the Economy and Finance (Ministres de l'Économie et des Finances) of the Republic of Senegal.

List of ministers
 André Peytavin (April 1959 – November 1962)
 Valdiodio Ndiaye (November 1962 – December 1963)
 Daniel Cabou (December 1963 – February 1964)
 Jean Collin (February 1964 – April 1971)
 Babacar Ba (April 1971 – March 1978)
 Ousmane Seck (March 1978 – April 1983)
 Mamoudou Touré (May 1983 – April 1988)
 Serigne Lamine Diop (April 1988 – March 1990)
 Moussa Touré (April 1990 – April 1991)
 Famara Ibrahima Sagna (April 1991 – June 1993)
 Papa Ousmane Sakho (June 1993 – January 1998)
 Mamadou Lamine Loum (January 1998 – July 1998)
 Moustapha Diagne (July 1998 – April 2000)
 Makhtar Diop (April 2000 – May 2001)
 Mamadou Seck (12 May 2001 – 23 May 2001)
 Abdoulaye Diop (May 2001 – 2012)
 Amadou Kane, (2012 – 2013)
 Amadou Ba, (2013 – 2019)
 Abdoulaye Daouda Diallo, (2019 – )
Source:

References

See also 
 Politics of Senegal
 Economy of Senegal

Lists of government ministers of Senegal

Senegal